Pipe Smoker of the Year was an award given out annually by the British Pipesmokers' Council, to honour a famous pipe-smoking individual. Initiated in 1965 as Pipeman of the Year by the Briar Pipe Trade Association, it was presented at a lunch in London's Savoy Hotel each January. The award was discontinued in 2004 because its organisers feared it fell foul of laws banning all advertising and promotion of tobacco.

The award was briefly reintroduced in 2014, by the UK Federation of Pipe Clubs, at the British Pipe Smoking Championship at Newark Showground. In a departure from previous awards the recipient was not a celebrity, but the outgoing President of the UK Federation of Pipe Clubs Brian Mills, in recognition for his personal contribution in recommencing the British Pipe Smoking Championships.

Pipe Smokers of the Year

 1964 – Rupert Davies
 1965 – Harold Wilson
 1966 – Andrew Cruickshank
 1967 – Warren Mitchell
 1968 – Peter Cushing
 1969 – Jack Hargreaves
 1970 – Eric Morecambe
 1971/72 – Lord Shinwell
 1973 – Frank Muir
 1974 – Fred Trueman
 1975 – Campbell Adamson
 1976 – Harold Wilson (Pipeman of the Decade)
 1977 – Brian Barnes
 1978 – Magnus Magnusson
 1979 – J. B. Priestley
 1980 – Edward Fox
 1981 – James Galway
 1982 – Dave Lee Travis
 1983 – Patrick Moore
 1984 – Henry Cooper
 1985 – Jimmy Greaves
 1986 –  David Bryant
 1987 – Barry Norman
 1988 – Ian Botham
 1989 – Jeremy Brett
 1990 – Laurence Marks
 1991 – John Harvey-Jones
 1992 – Tony Benn
 1993 – Rod Hull
 1994 – Ranulph Fiennes
 1995 – Jethro
 1996 – Colin Davis
 1997 – Malcolm Bradbury
 1998 – Willie John McBride
 1999 – Trevor Baylis
 2000 – Joss Ackland
 2001 – Russ Abbot
 2002 – Richard Dunhill
 2003 – Stephen Fry
 2014 – Brian Mills

Notes

References

Pipe smoking
Smoking in the United Kingdom
2004 disestablishments in the United Kingdom
Awards disestablished in 2004
1964 establishments in the United Kingdom
Awards established in 1964